XHRAC-FM is a radio station in Campeche, Campeche. It carries Radio Fórmula programming.

History
In 1958, XERAC-AM 1430 received its concession. It retains the same concessionaire to this day, though it migrated to FM in 2010.

References

Radio stations in Campeche
Mass media in Campeche City